Cueto may refer to:

Cueto (surname)
Cueto, Cuba, a municipality in Holguin, Cuba
Cueto, Spain, Cantabria, Spain